This is a list of notable individuals born in Cuba of Lebanese ancestry or people of Lebanese and Cuban dual nationality who live or lived in Cuba.

People
 Yamil Chade - Lebanese-Cuban sports manager
 Emilio Estefan - Cuban-American musician and producer; husband of Gloria Estefan
 Lili Estefan - Cuban-American television personality, niece of Emilio Estefan
 Fayad Jamís - Cuban-Mexican poet and philosopher who played a major role in the Cuban intellectual life and collective identity development in the early 20th century - 
 Jamillette Gaxiola - Miss Cuba 2009
 Taufic Guarch - Mexican-Cuban-Lebanese footballer

See also
List of Lebanese people
List of Lebanese people (Diaspora)

References

Lists of Cuban people
Cuba
Lebanese